The 1974 winners of the Torneo di Viareggio (in English, the Viareggio Tournament, officially the Viareggio Cup World Football Tournament Coppa Carnevale), the annual youth football tournament held in Viareggio, Tuscany, are listed below.

Format
The 16 teams are organized in knockout rounds. The round of 16 and the round of 8 are played in two-legs, while semifinals and finals are single tie.

Participating teams
Italian teams

  Bologna
  Fiorentina
  Genoa
  Inter Milan
  Lazio
  Napoli
  Roma
  Sampdoria

European teams

  Rapid București
  Everton
  Ferencváros
  Dinamo Zagreb
  Vojvodina
  Amsterdam
  Eintracht Frankfurt
  Rangers

Tournament fixtures

Champions

Footnotes

External links
 Official Site (Italian)
 Results on RSSSF.com

1974
1973–74 in Italian football
1973–74 in Yugoslav football
1973–74 in German football
1973–74 in Dutch football
1973–74 in English football
1973–74 in Scottish football
1973–74 in Hungarian football
1973–74 in Romanian football